Chlorocyphidae is a family of damselflies, commonly known as jewels. These are colorful species native to the Old World tropics, where they occur along forest streams. They are most diverse in Southeast Asia.

Systematics
This family is monophyletic. It currently contains about 19 genera.

Genera include:

Africocypha
Aristocypha
Calocypha
Chlorocypha
Cyrano
Disparocypha
Indocypha
Libellago
Melanocypha
Pachycypha
Platycypha
Rhinocypha
Rhinoneura
Sclerocypha
Sundacypha
Watuwila

Gallery

See also 
 List of damselflies of the world (Chlorocyphidae)

References

 
Odonata families
Odonata of Asia
Taxa named by John Cowley (entomologist)